Marinobacter salarius is a Gram-negative and motile bacterium from the genus of Marinobacter which has been isolated from sea water from the Chazhma Bay from the Sea of Japan.

References

Further reading

External links
Type strain of Marinobacter salarius at BacDive -  the Bacterial Diversity Metadatabase

Alteromonadales
Bacteria described in 2015